Frederick William Wright (born 28 October 1933 in New Glasgow, Nova Scotia) was a Progressive Conservative party member of the House of Commons of Canada. He was an investment counsellor and property manager by career.

He served in the 32nd Canadian Parliament at the Calgary North electoral district which he won in the 1980 federal election. He left federal politics after this single term and did not campaign in the 1984 election.

External links
 

1933 births
Canadian people of English descent
Living people
Members of the House of Commons of Canada from Alberta
People from New Glasgow, Nova Scotia
Progressive Conservative Party of Canada MPs